The Assyrian conquest of Elam refers to the conquest of Elam in western Persia by the Neo-Assyrian Empire (911 BC-609 BC). The Elamite lands were finally ravaged beyond repair in 639 BC.

Background
Clashes between the Elamites and the Assyrians had been ongoing for many years prior to 721 BC, the first recorded conflict between Elamites and Assyrians. For many centuries before that, the Elamites had made it a habit of intervening in Babylonian politics. Naturally this would have placed them in conflict with the Assyrians, who saw Babylon as within their sphere of influence. In 721 BC, the Babylonians rebelled against Assyria and Elamite forces attempted to aid Babylon in her revolt. Following this event, the Assyrians and Elamites clashed on numerous occasions; at the Tigris in 717 BC, along the Elamite coast as part of an amphibious invasion in 694 BC, at the province of Der and again at the River Diyala in 693 BC (this may have been the same battle). For the most part, these battles were bloody and inconclusive. However, the Assyrians were able to obtain the upper hand for the most part, demonstrated by the failure of the Elamites to extend their power beyond the boundaries of Mesopotamia.

After a failed attack on Babylon in 655 BC, Elamite power soon began to collapse. At the Battle of Ulai in the plain of Susa, an Assyrian army assaulted strong Elamite defensive positions. The Elamites were soundly beaten and Teumman, the Elamite king, was beheaded during the battle. Although another Babylonian revolt saved Elam from immediate invasion, it would remain one of the most important objectives in the mind of  Assurbanipal.

Campaign against Elam
In 648 BC, the Elamite city of Susa was razed to the ground; it was to be a terrible portent of events to come. In 639 BC, the Assyrians moved their entire army from the west to destroy their enemies; it would be their last and most glorious act of retribution and conquest that the Assyrians had mastered like none before.

Collapse of Elam
The defeats inflicted by Assyria on Elamite offensives were one of many problems facing the Elamites; civil war had erupted in the land, whilst her northern borders were being overrun by the Persians. In 639 BC, Assurbanipal moved into Elam and proudly documented the vengeance against Elamite incursions:

With Elam destroyed, the Assyrians returned to find their empire falling apart; years of war had destroyed their ability to wage it. Within 34 years of Elam's destruction, Assyria fell as an independent political entity in the Middle East forever.

See also
Battle of Susa

References

7th-century BC conflicts
Elam
7th century BC
Elam